The Atlantic Wall & Air War Bunker Museum Antwerp is a military war museum in Park den Brandt, Wilrijk (Antwerp) in Belgium which preserves fortifications of the Atlantic Wall dating to the Second World War. In the Park a total of 8 bunkers are to be found.

Bunker Village 
The Bunker Village was built during the Second World War for the Atlantic Wall in Belgium comprises eight bunkers of which three are open to the public. In total, two of the three bunkers developed into a full-fledged war museum with the Atlantic Wall and Air War as specialization.

The Bunkers 
 Bunker SK1, in which is the museum. This type of bunker, SK1 stands for Sonderkonstruktion 1, is seldom.
 Bunker SK1 (Number 2), is not open to the public.
 5x Troopsbunker of Type VF52A, of which one is open to the public.
 1x Hospitalbunker of Type VF57A, open to the public.

War Museum 
The actual museum of the bunker village is located in the Sonderkonstruktion 1 (SK1) bunker also the main command bunker of the Atlantic Wall in Belgium. In this museum are numerous archaeological pieces on display from several fortifications, a lot of documentation relating to the Atlantic; Air War and Antwerp itself during the war. The museum is unique in and around Antwerp thanks to its engine room that is almost entirely complete and in which machines are made functional again. As well parts of the V1 and V2 Weapons are free to visit, so you get a unique look at how these bombs worked.

History of the Bunker Village 
During World War II this bunker village was built as the main command for the Atlantic Wall in Belgium. The command ran from the French border to Walcheren. The troops which were in the bunkers and surrounding stationed was the LXXXIX. Army Corps led by General Werner Freiherr von und zu Gilsa and his staff. Not only von und zu Gilsa, but also General der Panzertruppen Alfred Ritter von Hubicki and even Generalfeldmarschall Rommel spent time visiting the Bunkers. Both Generals von Hubicki and von und zu Gilsa probably stayed in one of the houses around the park.

The bunkers were built in 1943 and after the landings in Normandy, on 29 August 1944, a few days before the liberation of Antwerp, the bunkers were abandoned by General von und zu Gilsa and his staff. After the war, in particular on 1 July 1947, all the furniture and equipment both inside and outside the bunkers were sold through auction. Afterwards, on 19 July 1947, plans were drawn up to demolish the bunkers but the plans were called off on March 20, 1948.

Before 1985 the command bunkers were still used by the Civil Protection, but moved afterwards.

Eventually the bunker village was recognized as Monument on June 11, 2004.

External links 
 Atlantic Wall & Air War Bunker Museum Antwerp

Museums in Antwerp